Refuge de la Dent Parrachée is a refuge of Savoie, France. It lies in the Massif de la Vanoise range. It has an altitude of  2511 metres above sea level.

Mountain huts in the Alps
Mountain huts in France